Davide Balestrero (born 6 October 1995) is an Italian footballer who plays as a midfielder for Serie C side Feralpisalò.

Club career
Balestrero started his career in Lavagnese, he signed to Serie D side Sestri Levante in December 2013. He started the 2014–15 season at Novese, to 2015–16 he returned to the Lavagnese. On the summer of 2016, he signed to Lega Pro side Monopoli. He made his debut at the third tier of Italian football on 4 September 2016, in the 2nd round against Casertana, playing 90 minutes. He left Monopoli on the summer of 2017 to fourth-tier Vibonese, but he played 42 minutes in 2 match. In winter, he left for Savona. On the summer of 2018, he returned to Serie C as Albissola signed him.

On 6 July 2019, he joined Arzignano.

On 24 August 2020 he signed with Matelica, freshly promoted into Serie C.

On 29 June 2021, he moved to Feralpisalò.

References

Sources
 
 

1995 births
Living people
Footballers from Genoa
Association football midfielders
Italian footballers
Serie C players
Serie D players
U.S.D. Sestri Levante 1919 players
U.S.D. Novese players
U.S.D. Lavagnese 1919 players
S.S. Monopoli 1966 players
U.S. Vibonese Calcio players
Savona F.B.C. players
Albissola 2010 players
F.C. Arzignano Valchiampo players
S.S. Matelica Calcio 1921 players
FeralpiSalò players